Arktikum is a museum and science centre in Rovaniemi, Finland.  The building is also a popular culture destination and venue for meetings and conferences and has a cafe and library to serve the customers. Two separate exhibitions operate at Arktikum, the Arctic Center, and the Provincial Museum of Lapland.

Exhibitions
The exhibitions at the Provincial Museum of Lapland and the Arctic Center examine culture, history, and modern life in the Arctic. Concepts such as human life in tune with nature are explored in depth. There are also temporary exhibitions in Arktikum.

History
Arktikum opened to the public on 6 December 1992, the 75th anniversary of Finland's independence. It was designed by Danish architect group Birch-Bonderup & Thorup-Waade. The crescent-shaped new annex was designed by Claus Bonderup and Janne Lehtipalo, and it was completed in autumn 1997.

Architecture
Plenty of local natural materials have been used in the building: the floors are made from Perttaus granite – the hardest type available in Finland – and from lime-washed Lappish pine. The chairs are made from birch and reindeer hide.

The most visible part of the museum, its glass corridor, is 172 metres long in all and it is dissected by the 30-metre wide Kittilä highway. The tube serves as the “Gateway to the North”, as the entrance foyer is at the southern end and guests head north when coming in. The exhibition space is sheltered below the ground, mimicking the way animals in the North take cover from the harsh, cold winter by burrowing under the snow.

Awards
According to Topworld International, the museum is the 4th best travel attraction in Finland.

Gallery

External links

 Official website

Science museums in Finland
Rovaniemi
Museums in Lapland (Finland)